Free Holmes was a driver of standardbred racehorses in New Zealand, possibly the most famous that New Zealand has ever had. 

He was known as "The Grand Old Man of Trotting". 

He is notable for being both a champion driver and formerly a champion jockey. He won a unique double of the New Zealand Cup in 1888 for thoroughbreds, at Riccarton, riding Manton, and in 1919 driving Trix Pointer to win the NZ Trotting Cup at the Addington Raceway.  As a jockey, he also won the 1894 Grand National Hurdles and 1895 Great Northern Hurdles and Steeplechase with Liberator. He also won two Auckland Trotting Cups.

"Old Free" as he was reverently known in the trotting fraternity was also an expert in the management of thoroughbred horses. He successful raced, trained and owned horses both over the fences and on the flat. He also rode and drove trotters.  His son Maurice Holmes was also a driving legend.

Major wins
 1936 Inter Dominion Pacing Championship Evicus
 1935 Auckland Trotting Cup Graham Direct
 1934 Auckland Trotting Cup Roi L'Or
 1932 New Zealand Free For All Roi L'Or
 1922 New Zealand Free For All Trix Pointer
 1919 New Zealand Trotting Cup Trix Pointer
 1888 New Zealand Cup Manton (this was a Thoroughbred race)
 1888 New Zealand Derby Manton (this was a Thoroughbred race)

See also
 Harness racing in New Zealand
 Thoroughbred racing in New Zealand

References 

New Zealand harness racers
 New Zealand racehorse trainers